Seville was a railway station on the Warburton line in Melbourne, Australia.  The station operated until the line closed in 1965.  All that remains of this station is a poorly preserved timber retaining wall for the station platform.

External links
Seville station shortly after closing, 24 November 1964.

Disused railway stations in Melbourne
Railway stations in Australia opened in 1901
Railway stations closed in 1965
1965 disestablishments in Australia